Nelspruit Airport, South Africa is located about  south west of the city of Mbombela. It was the city's original and only airport serving the region until the opening of Kruger Mpumalanga International Airport in 2001. It is owned and operated by the municipality. As of 2018 it now serves mostly general aviation. There are over a hundred aircraft based at the airport. The majority of the aircraft are privately owned but there are several commercial aircraft based here as well. There are several Authorised Maintenance Organisations (AMO), fire fighting, charter & training companies based at the airport. The airport is limited in its potential operations by its runway length of 875 m (2870 ft). The topography of the area prohibits expansion.

References

Airports in South Africa
Mbombela
Transport in Mpumalanga
Buildings and structures in Mpumalanga